This article provides information on candidates who stood for the 1953 Australian Senate election. The election was held on 9 May 1953.

By-elections, appointments and defections

By-elections and appointments
On 7 February 1952, Joe Cooke (Labor) was appointed a Western Australian Senator to replace Richard Nash (Labor).
On 30 September 1952, Bill Robinson (Country) was appointed a Western Australian Senator to replace Edmund Piesse (Country).
On 3 March 1953, John Marriott (Liberal) was appointed a Tasmanian Senator to replace Jack Chamberlain (Liberal).

Defections
In 1953, Labor Senator Bill Morrow (Tasmania) was defeated for preselection. He contested the election as a member of his own party, the "Tasmanian Labor Party".

Retiring Senators

Labor
Senator Alex Finlay (SA)

Liberal
Senator John Tate (NSW)

Senate
Sitting Senators are shown in bold text. Tickets that elected at least one Senator are highlighted in the relevant colour. Successful candidates are identified by an asterisk (*).

New South Wales
Five seats were up for election. The Labor Party was defending three seats. The Liberal-Country Coalition was defending two seats. Senators John Armstrong (Labor), Bill Ashley (Labor), John McCallum (Liberal), Albert Reid (Country) and Bill Spooner (Liberal) were not up for re-election.

Queensland
Five seats were up for election. The Labor Party was defending two seats. The Liberal-Country Coalition was defending three seats. Senators Archie Benn (Labor), Walter Cooper (Country), Ben Courtice (Labor), Neil O'Sullivan (Liberal) and Annabelle Rankin (Liberal) were not up for re-election.

South Australia
Five seats were up for election. The Labor Party was defending three seats. The Liberal Party was defending two seats. Senators Clive Hannaford (Liberal), Ted Mattner (Liberal), George McLeay (Liberal), Theo Nicholls (Labor) and Sid O'Flaherty (Labor) were not up for re-election.

Tasmania

Six seats were up for election. One of these was a short-term vacancy caused by Liberal Senator Jack Chamberlain's death; this had been filled in the interim by Liberal John Marriott. The Labor Party was defending four seats (although sitting senator Bill Morrow contested the election for the "Tasmanian Labor Party"). The Liberal Party was defending two seats. Senators Allan Guy (Liberal), Denham Henty (Liberal), Nick McKenna (Labor) and Reg Wright (Liberal) were not up for re-election.

Victoria

Five seats were up for election. The Labor Party was defending two seats. The Liberal Party was defending three seats. Senators Don Cameron (Labor), George Rankin (Country), Charles Sandford (Labor), Jim Sheehan (Labor) and John Spicer (Liberal) were not up for re-election.

Western Australia

Six seats were up for election. One of these was a short-term vacancy caused by Country Party Senator Edmund Piesse's death; this had been filled in the interim by Bill Robinson, also of the Country Party. The Labor Party was defending two seats. The Liberal-Country Coalition was defending four seats. Senators Agnes Robertson (Liberal), Dorothy Tangney (Labor), Seddon Vincent (Liberal) and Don Willesee (Labor) were not up for re-election.

Summary by party 

Beside each party is an indication of whether the party contested the Senate election in each state.

See also
 1953 Australian Senate election
 Members of the Australian Senate, 1951–1953
 Members of the Australian Senate, 1953–1956
 List of political parties in Australia

References
Adam Carr's Election Archive - Senate 1953

1953 in Australia
Candidates for Australian federal elections